Neely House may refer to:

Neely House (Martinsville, Indiana)
Thompson-Neely House, Solebury Township, Pennsylvania
Mallory–Neely House, Memphis, Tennessee
John Neely House, Thompsons Station, Tennessee